A patent ambush occurs when a member of a standard-setting organization withholds information, during participation in development and setting a standard, about a patent that the member or the member's company owns, has pending, or intends to file, which is relevant to the standard, and subsequently the company asserts that a patent is infringed by use of the standard as adopted.

Standards-setting organizations, such as the IEEE and ANSI, typically require each member of their committees engaged in standard setting to file a letter with the organization stating either that the member does not know of any patents of their company relevant to the standard or else identifying those patents about which they know. When the organization is advised of relevant patents, often it will either seek to use a different technology for the standard or obtain a commitment from the patent owner that it will license users of the standard on fair reasonable and non-discriminatory (FRAND) terms.

Once the proposed standard has been adopted, companies wishing to implement the standard may be forced to pay substantial royalties to the patent holder, creating barriers to entry that distort competition within the market. Consequently, the practice has been considered to be in breach of antitrust or competition law in the United States and the European Union and has resulted in several lawsuits and other actions.

In the United States, a patent ambush may involve the filing of a continuation application with claims targeting a standard or the exploitation of a submarine patent, that is, a patent application which has been filed but has not yet been made public years after the filing.

See also
Essential patent, a patent which is essential for implementing e.g. a standard
Patent misuse
Patent thicket

References

Further reading
 Brian Dean Abramson, "The patent ambush: misuse or caveat emptor?, IDEA: The Intellectual Property Law Review, Vol. 51 No. 1, 2011, pp. 71-109.

Ambush, patent